Murder Ahoy! is the last of four Miss Marple films made by Metro-Goldwyn-Mayer that starred Margaret Rutherford. As in the previous three, the actress plays Agatha Christie's amateur sleuth Miss Jane Marple, with Charles 'Bud' Tingwell as (Chief) Inspector Craddock and Stringer Davis (Rutherford's husband) playing Mr Stringer.

The film was made in 1964 and directed by George Pollock, with David Pursall and Jack Seddon credited with the script. The music was by Ron Goodwin. Location shots included Denham Village and St Mawes, Cornwall.

Unlike the previous three films that were adapted from Christie novels – The 4.50 from Paddington (Murder, She Said – the only Miss Marple novel used), After the Funeral (a Poirot mystery, adapted for Miss Marple with the title Murder at the Gallop) and Mrs. McGinty's Dead (another Poirot novel, adapted as Murder Most Foul) – this film used an original screenplay that was not based on any of Christie's stories.

It does, however, employ elements of the 1952 Miss Marple story They Do It With Mirrors. Specifically, the Battledore is a training ship for teenage boys with criminal tendencies, who are supposedly being set on the straight and narrow path – when, in fact, one of the members of the crew is training them for careers in housebreaking. Likewise, in They Do It With Mirrors, Lewis Serrocold is running his wife's mansion, Stonygates, as a boarding school for delinquent youths, to straighten out their lives – but, in fact, he is training selected students to hone their criminal skills, not to give them up. That is the only element borrowed into the film from a Christie story.

There is also a reference to The Mousetrap, the Christie play running on the West End since 1952.

Plot
The action takes place mainly on board an old wooden-walled battleship, HMS Battledore, which has been purchased by a Trust for the rehabilitation of young criminals, and intended by the founder to "put backbone into young jellyfish."

Shortly after joining the board of management of the Trust, Miss Marple (Margaret Rutherford) witnesses the sudden death of a fellow trustee, who has just returned from a surprise visit to the ship, much disturbed by something he has discovered there.  He dies without being able to reveal his discovery. Miss Marple manages to obtain a small sample of his snuff, which is found to have been poisoned.

Resolving to learn what the murdered trustee had discovered, she visits the ship, while her dear friend and confidante, Mr. Jim Stringer (played by Margaret Rutherford's husband Stringer Davis), investigates on shore. The Captain (Lionel Jeffries) takes an immediate dislike to her, and makes a sarcastic comment to the ship's First Mate (second in command) Commander Breeze-Connington (William Mervyn), about her outdated formal naval attire, asking "Who does she think she is, Neptune's mother?" His distress intensifies when she announces her intention to remain on board several days, and to sleep in the Captain's own quarters, obliging him to move into the First Mate`s cabin.

That night, Miss Marple and Mr. Stringer use morse code and flashlights to communicate and Miss Marple asks him to tail the sailors that just went ashore. Mr. Stringer finds that they are robbing houses and takes their dinghy to row to the ship and inform Miss Marple. Lt. Compton overhears their conversation and is heading down to tell the Captain when he is murdered – run through with a sword and then hanged from a mast. As the police investigation proceeds, the assistant matron is killed, apparently by an injection of poison. The investigation interferes with the ship's traditional celebration of Trafalgar Day.  Somewhat unreasonably, the Captain blames Miss Marple for this. He begs Chief Inspector Craddock (Charles 'Bud' Tingwell) to find a way to get her off the ship, saying: "She's a jinx!  She's a Jonah!  She's blowing an ill wind!"

Miss Marple sets a trap. First, she persuades Chief Inspector Craddock to allow the crew to go ashore for their Trafalgar Day celebration. Then, she announces to the crew that she knows that the poison was administered using a mousetrap as a booby-trap, and she hints that she intends to reveal the murderer's identity shortly. When the crew leaves the ship, Chief Inspector Craddock and his assistant, Sgt. Bacon (Terence Edmond) secretly remain on board, hiding in wait for the murderer to reveal himself by attempting to silence Miss Marple. Miss Marple searches the ship for the loaded mousetrap, cautiously using a sword, not her hands, to poke into possible hiding places. She finds the mousetrap concealed in the barrel of a cannon, and with it, a large sum of money. Commander Breeze-Connington, armed with his sword, confronts her. In response to her questioning, he informs her that he has embezzled the money gradually during his many years on the Battledore - money he considers the service owed him because he was unjustly passed over for promotion while serving in the Royal Navy. He acknowledges having committed the three preceding murders to avoid being exposed, and adds that he intends to kill her on the spot, take the money, and flee the country.

Miss Marple calls out to Chief-Inspector Craddock to make the arrest, but Craddock and Sgt. Bacon have been accidentally locked in their hiding place and cannot help. Breeze-Connington draws his sword, intending to run Miss Marple through, but Miss Marple is herself an accomplished amateur fencer.  She and Breeze-Connington engage in a ferocious sword-fight. Breeze-Connington succeeds in disarming her and is about to administer the coup de grace, but Mr. Stringer, whom Miss Marple had thought was ashore, clubs him over the head from behind with a belaying pin.

The Captain faces a court martial for failing to detect the embezzlement during his command. As he enters the state-room to hear the verdict, he sees his sword on the table with the hilt toward him, and mistakenly infers that he has been found guilty. Miss Marple corrects him; the board has found that he is not at fault. Although greatly relieved to have avoided disgrace, he announces that he must resign even so, because he has been having a long affair with the ship's Matron (Joan Benham). This is a violation of the golden rule of the trust that there should be "no hanky-panky between the sexes" on board ship. They now intend to get married, which would disqualify him for his position as Captain. He makes his farewell and turns to go, but Miss Marple stops him, saying, "I think I speak for my fellow trustees when I say that golden rule is hereby rescinded. You're a fine sea dog captain, but it seems to me the Battledore could do with a woman's hand at the helm."  He and Matron embrace joyfully.

As Miss Marple steps into the dinghy to leave the ship, Matron and the Captain wave good-bye from the deck. The Captain turns to Matron and remarks, "You know, the moment I clapped eyes on her, I said to myself, 'What an old darling'!"  Matron, remembering his actual first reaction, raises her eyebrows archly.

Cast

 Margaret Rutherford – Miss Jane Marple
 Lionel Jeffries – Captain Sydney De Courcy Rhumstone
 Charles Tingwell – Chief Inspector Craddock
 William Mervyn – Commander Breeze-Connington
 Joan Benham – Matron Alice Fanbraid
 Stringer Davis – Mr. Jim Stringer
 Nicholas Parsons – Dr. Crump
 Miles Malleson – Bishop Faulkner
 Henry Oscar – Lord Rudkin
 Derek Nimmo – Sub-Lieutenant Eric Humbert
 Gerald Cross – Brewer (aka Lieutenant Commander Dimchurch)
 Norma Foster – Assistant Matron Shirley Boston
 Terence Edmond – Sergeant Bacon
 Francis Matthews – Lieutenant Compton
 Lucy Griffiths – Millie
 Bernard Adams – Dusty Miller
 Tony Quinn – Kelly (tramp)
 Edna Petrie – Miss Pringle
 Bill Dean - Police Constable (uncredited)
 Roy Holder – Petty Officer Lamb (uncredited)
 Henry B. Longhurst – Cecil Ffolly-Hardwicke (uncredited)
 Desmond Roberts – Sir Geoffrey Bucknose (uncredited)
 Ivor Salter – Police Sergeant (uncredited)
 Arnold Schulkes – Officer (uncredited)
 Paddy Smith – Steward (uncredited)

References

External links

 
 

1964 films
1960s mystery films
British mystery films
Miss Marple
Films based on works by Agatha Christie
Films directed by George Pollock
Metro-Goldwyn-Mayer films
Films scored by Ron Goodwin
Films shot at MGM-British Studios
1960s English-language films
1960s British films